This is a list of diplomatic missions in Equatorial Guinea. There are currently 28 embassies in Malabo. Honorary Consulates are not listed below:

Embassies in Malabo

Consular missions

Bata
 (Consulate)
 (Consulate-General)
 (Consulate)
 (Consulate-General)

Mongomo
 (Consulate)

Non-resident embassies 

Resident in Abuja, Nigeria:

 

Resident in Yaoundé, Cameroon:

Resident elsewhere:

 (Madrid)
 (Brazzaville) 
 (New York City)
 (Accra)
 (Paris)
 (Pretoria)
 (London)
 (Libreville)
 (Addis Ababa)
 (Abuja)
 (Luanda)
 (Pretoria)
 (Libreville)
 (Luanda)
 (Kinshasa)
 (Madrid)
 (Luanda)

See also 
 Foreign relations of Equatorial Guinea
 List of diplomatic missions of Equatorial Guinea

References

 
Equatorial Guinea
Diplomatic missions